Volksparkstadion is a football stadium in Hamburg, Germany, and is the home of Hamburger SV.

History

HSV actually have nothing to do with the origins of the stadium, even though they own the current arena. Before the club moved to the current site they played at Sportplatz at Rothenbaum. Bahrenfelder Stadion was the first stadium to be built on the site of the Volksparkstadion and the AOL Arena. It was inaugurated on 13 September 1925 with a match between FC Altona 93 and HSV. In front a crowd of 25,000, HSV lost 2–3. At the time the stadium was also known as Altonaer Stadion, however it was not the home ground of FC Altona 93 (it was Adolf-Jäger-Kampfbahn). Altona was a large club of Germany that has long been surpassed by HSV.

After a long break the stadium was finally renovated. Between 1951 and 1953 the stadium was rebuilt. On 12 July the stadium was opened as Volksparkstadion (The People's Park Stadium), named after its location at Altona Volkspark (People's Park). Most of the building materials came from the ruins of Eimsbüttel, a district of Hamburg destroyed under Allied bombing. The new stadium could hold up to 75,000 and continued to be used for the various sporting events of the city.

In 1963, when HSV qualified for the newly created Bundesliga, they moved into the Volksparkstadion, a stadium that was both larger and more modern than Rothenbaum. At this time, FC Altona missed out on the opportunity and has struggled ever since. HSV then began to see some success in the Bundesliga and managed to maintain their status for years to come. HSV won titles in 1979, 1982 and 1983.

In May 1998 HSV decided to replace the unpopular Volksparkstadion with a brand new stadium, not only to help Germany get ready to host the Football World Cup, but also because it was getting increasingly more difficult to meet the safety standards with such an old facility. The old stadium was demolished and the new arena was rotated 90° to provide an equal viewing experience for all the stands and to take advantage of sunlight. The estimated cost of the new stadium was €90-100 million. The new arena serves both as a football ground and a concert hall. The capacity of the stadium during club matches is 57,000, which is reduced to 51,500 during international matches when the standing sections in the north grandstand are converted into seated areas. The record attendance was attained in Hamburger SV's victory over Bayern Munich (1–0) on  30 January 2009, when 57,000 paying spectators were counted.

The building permit for the new arena was issued on 30 April 1998. The new stadium removed the track and field facilities that increased the distance between the pitch and the stands. The stadium was inaugurated on 2 September 2000 when Germany played Greece; the home team won 2–0. With the new stadium, HSV has managed to attain an average attendance of 50,000. In 2004 a museum dedicated to the history of HSV was opened.

The stadium is a UEFA category 4 stadium which makes it eligible it to host UEFA Europa League and UEFA Champions League finals.

A large clock was added to the northwest corner in 2001 to commemorate HSV's status as the only club to have played continuously in the Bundesliga since its foundation.  The clock marks the time, down to the second, since the league was founded on 24 August 1963. However, after Hamburg's relegation to the 2nd tier, it was updated to reflect HSV's foundation. After the 2018–19 season though, the clock was ultimately taken down, replaced with the coordinates of the Volksparkstadion.

In 2001 AOL bought the naming rights to the Volksparkstadion for €15.3 million, retitling the ground as the AOL Arena. In March 2007 the HSH Nordbank bought the naming rights for €25 million, and the stadium was rebranded as the "HSH Nordbank Arena" in a six-year deal. From July 2010 the arena was called the Imtech Arena, after Imtech bought the naming rights. After Imtech's sponsorship ended in June 2015, the stadium reverted to its original name of Volksparkstadion. Due to UEFA regulations, when the stadium had a sponsored name it was referred to as the Hamburg Arena  for European matches.

Tournaments hosted

1974 FIFA World Cup
The 1974 FIFA World Cup was held in West Germany and the Volksparkstadion was one of the stadiums used in the tournament. In combination with the 1936 Berlin Olympic Stadium the two stadiums held all of the Group A games of the first phase. Three of those were played at the Volksparkstadion. The first game played was the match between East Germany and Australia (East Germany won 2–0) where attendance dipped to a low of only 17,000. The next game, with the home side West Germany playing Australia, saw a bounceback with 53,300 in attendance (West Germany won 3–0). The attendance grew even more for the next match  to 60,200 as home side West Germany played neighbouring East Germany. East Germany won the close game 1–0 with an 80th-minute goal.

UEFA Euro 1988
In 1988 the European Football Championship came to West Germany. The Volksparkstadion was chosen to be one of the host stadia. At the time the stadium could hold 61,200 spectators. The only game of the tournament that was played at the stadium was a semi-final that saw hosts West Germany lose to the Netherlands 1–2.

2006 FIFA World Cup
The stadium was one of the venues for the 2006 FIFA World Cup. However, due to sponsorship contracts, the arena was known as FIFA World Cup Stadium Hamburg during the World Cup.

The following games were played at the stadium during the World Cup of 2006:

2010 UEFA Europa League Final
The stadium hosted the 2010 UEFA Europa League Final, in which Spanish side Atlético Madrid beat English club Fulham 2–1.

Transport
The stadium's nearest railway station is Stellingen railway station. The station is on the S3 & S21 lines of the Hamburg S-Bahn and is also served from Schleswig-Holstein in the north by AKN railways. A free bus shuttle service is provided during football matches or other major events from Stellingen railway station and from Othmarschen railway station to the stadium. There are several large car parks around the stadium. The A7 runs close by and the stadium can be reached via the exit Hamburg-Volkspark.

Other uses 

The stadium hosted the heavyweight unification boxing match between Wladimir Klitschko and David Haye on 2 July 2011. Klitschko won by unanimous decision. The stadium sold out.

The stadium hosted the German leg of the worldwide concert event Live Earth on 7 July 2007. Among the artists performing in Hamburg were Shakira, Snoop Dogg, Eminem and Cat Stevens/Yusuf Islam. Other musical performances at the Volksparkstadion include those of: Michael Jackson, in 1988 as part of his Bad World Tour and 1992 as part of his Dangerous World Tour; Tina Turner in 1996 during her "Wildest Dreams Tour" and in 2000 during her "Twenty Four Seven Tour"; Depeche Mode in 2009 during their Tour of the Universe and in 2013 during their Delta Machine Tour; Metallica in 2014 as a part of their By Request Tour; AC/DC in 2016 for their Rock or Bust World Tour; Coldplay in 2016 for their A Head Full of Dreams Tour; Rihanna in 2016 for her Anti World Tour; P!nk in 2019 for her Beautiful Trauma World Tour. The Weeknd will perform at the stadium on 2 July 2023 as part of his After Hours til Dawn Tour.

Panorama

References

External links

 Pictures of the Volksparkstadion

American football venues in Germany
1974 FIFA World Cup stadiums
2006 FIFA World Cup stadiums
Football venues in Hamburg
Hamburger SV
Buildings and structures in Altona, Hamburg
UEFA Euro 1988 stadiums
UEFA Euro 2024 stadiums
Sports venues completed in 1953
1953 establishments in Germany